Bob Hay may refer to:

Bob Hay (musician), American singer and songwriter
Bob Hay (general) (1920–1998), Australian army general and VFL footballer
Bob Hay (footballer, born 1880) (1880–1959), Australian rules footballer for Fitzroy 
Bob Hay (footballer, born 1938), Australian rules footballer for St Kilda, see List of St Kilda Football Club players
Bob Hay (racing driver), South African Formula One driver

See also
Robert Hay (disambiguation)